is a Japanese footballer currently playing as a defender for Thespakusatsu Gunma.

Career statistics

Club
.

Notes

References

External links

1996 births
Living people
Japanese footballers
Association football defenders
J3 League players
J2 League players
Thespakusatsu Gunma players